Rancho Estates is a neighborhood in Long Beach, California. It was designed by Cliff May and Chris Choate and completed between 1953 and 1954. The neighborhood was built by developer Ross Cortese, who also developed nearby Rossmoor and Leisure World. There are 700 homes in the neighborhood.

The ranch homes in this neighborhood originally sold for around $12,000. Prices now reach up to $1.95 million.

See also
Neighborhoods of Long Beach, California

References

Geography of Long Beach, California
Addams